Crossfire Trail is a 2001 American made-for-television western film directed by Simon Wincer and starring Tom Selleck, Virginia Madsen, and Wilford Brimley. Based on the 1954 Louis L'Amour Western novel of the same name, the film is about a wanderer named Rafe Covington who swears an oath to his dying best friend to look after his beloved wife and Wyoming ranch, only to encounter other forces who strongly desire the ranch and the woman for their own purposes.

Crossfire Trail premiered to 12.5 million viewers, making it the most-watched made-for-cable television movie ever, until the premiere of High School Musical 2 in 2007.

Plot 
In 1880, Rafe Covington (Tom Selleck) is with his best friend Charles Rodney on a vessel bound for San Francisco. Rodney is dying, having been severely beaten by the ship's captain (Mark Acheson). With his last breaths, Rodney makes Covington swear an oath to take care of his beloved Wyoming ranch and his wife, Anne (Virginia Madsen).

After beating the captain in vengeance of Rodney's death, Covington and his two other friends, Irishman Rock Mullaney (David O'Hara) and J.T. Langston (Christian Kane), head off to Wyoming. After a long trek through the Rocky Mountains, they find the ranch long deserted and immediately set to work restoring it.

Covington heads into the local town to pick up supplies. He finds Anne and informs her of what happened, but she refuses to believe him as it's been accepted that Rodney was killed by a Sioux war party a year previously. Anne is being wooed by a wealthy businessman named Bruce Barkow (Mark Harmon), who essentially runs the town and secretly desires the ranch for his own purposes.

Covington also makes friends with Joe Gill (Wilford Brimley), an older cowboy who was a good friend of Rodney's, but makes enemies with Barkow's men Mike (Patrick Kilpatrick) and Luke (Rex Linn) Taggart and Snake Corville (Marshall R. Teague), after Covington rescues the daughter of the Sioux chief Red Cloud (who Rodney had bought the ranch from years before) from Mike's clutches.

To the ire of Barkow, Covington, Rock, J.T., and Gill round up Rodney's scattered cattle and get the ranch going again. Covington repeatedly tries to convince Anne that he was there when Rodney died and is there to look after her and the ranch, but again and again she refuses to believe him. Meanwhile, Barkow attempts to convince Anne that Covington is interested in the ranch for himself.

One day, Covington, Rock, J.T., and Gill head into town for a drink, and Covington purchases a new Winchester Centennial rifle that was special ordered for Rodney. Outside, a severely drunk Mike challenges Covington to a duel. Covington tries to walk away, but when Mike draws his pistol and shoots, Covington returns fire with the rifle and kills him. Snake then attempts to ambush Covington from atop one of the buildings, but Covington notices and guns him down too. With the stakes now raised, Barkow sends for Beau Dorn (Brad Johnson), an infamous gunfighter with an impeccable reputation.

The next day, Covington, Gill, Rock, and J.T. discover large volumes of petroleum oil on the ranch. When they arrive back at the ranch house, they find Barkow there with his thugs. Barkow gives Covington three days to clear out with J.T. and Rock, or else he will have Dorn force them out. He offers Gill the chance to stay, but Gill openly sides with Covington.

Dorn arrives in town and meets with Barkow; he agrees to kill Covington and his friends in exchange for a piece of the ranch for himself. That night, Barkow officially proposes marriage to Anne, but she neither accepts nor rejects his proposal.

When the three days run out, Barkow sends Dorn to the ranch, where he perches atop a hill with a sniper rifle. Anne also rides out to the ranch and Covington shows her the pits of petroleum oil. Finally realizing Barkow's true intentions, Anne tells Covington she believes him and they kiss. Dorn opens fire with his rifle from afar, shooting J.T. in the heart and killing him.

Barkow's thugs then steal Rodney's cattle and herd them into town. When Anne rides in and tells Barkow she believes Covington, he angrily beats her and forces the town's cowardly sheriff to marry them in front of the townspeople, thereby giving him legal control over the ranch. Barkow then attempts to rape Anne in a hotel room, but he knocks her out when she fights back.

After holding a funeral for J.T., Covington, Rock, and Gill load up their guns and ride into town to confront Barkow and Dorn. A furious gunfight begins where Rock, Gill, and the town's general store owner take on Barkow and his thugs. Even though Gill and the store owner are both shot and wounded, all of Barkow's men are gunned down and Rock kills Luke by emptying his rifle into him.

Meanwhile, Covington engages Dorn in a tense one-on-one shootout. Dorn shoots Covington in the shoulder, but Covington plays dead and then shoots Dorn in the ankle and again in the chest when he isn't looking. Dorn slowly dies and Covington holsters his weapon, only to be shot again through the back by Barkow. Just as Barkow prepares to finish off Covington, Anne arrives and shoots him dead with Covington's rifle.

With the battle over and justice restored, the townspeople emerge from the buildings and Covington, Anne, Gill, and Rock reunite as the credits roll.

Cast
 Tom Selleck as Rafe Covington
 Virginia Madsen as Anne Rodney
 Wilford Brimley as Joe Gill
 David O'Hara as Rock Mullaney
 Christian Kane as J.T. Langston
 Mark Harmon as Bruce Barkow
 Brad Johnson as Beau Dorn
 Barry Corbin as Sheriff Walter Moncrief
 Ken Pogue as Gene Thompson
 Joanna Miles as Melissa Thompson
 Patrick Kilpatrick as Mike Taggart
 Rex Linn as Luke Taggart
 William Sanderson as Dewey the bartender
 Daniel Parker as Taggart gangmember (as Daniel T. Parker)
 Marshall R. Teague as Snake Corville (as Marshall Teague)
 Carmen Moore as Dancing Flower
 James Nicholas as Chief Red Cloud
 Glenn Gould as Bear Killer

Reception

Crossfire Trail received mixed reviews from critics, earning a 40% rating on Rotten Tomatoes. While the musical score and cinematography received praise, most critics suggested the film added nothing new to the Western genre as a whole.

References

External links 
 
 
 

2001 Western (genre) films
2001 television films
2001 films
TNT Network original films
Films directed by Simon Wincer
Films based on Western (genre) novels
Films based on American novels
Films based on works by Louis L'Amour
Films set in Wyoming